Bálint Magyar (born as János Magyar; 15 November 1952) is a Hungarian politician, who served as Minister of Education between 1996–1998 and between 2002–2006. He was a founding member of the Alliance of Free Democrats.

His book Magyar polip – A posztkommunista maffiaállam (2013) describes modern Hungary as a mafia state. An English translation of the book, Post-Communist Mafia State: The Case of Hungary, was published in 2016.

Family
His paternal grandparents were the journalist Elek Magyar and Berta Kürthy who was granddaughter of the 19th century Hungarian Prime Minister Bertalan Szemere. His father is the writer and theatre manager Bálint Magyar, Sr. His mother, Olga Siklós (b. Schwarcz), was born to a Jewish family in Kolozsvár. Bálint has a sister, Fruzsina who is the wife of Imre Mécs. Bálint Magyar's wife is Róza Hodosán, a former member of the National Assembly of Hungary. They have a daughter, Annamária.

Career
He earned a degree in history from the Faculty of Humanities of the Eötvös Loránd University in 1977. Magyar is a Research Fellow at the Financial Research Institute (since 2010) with a Doctoral degree in Political Economy (1980) from Faculty of Law of the Eötvös Loránd University in Budapest. He has published and edited numerous books on post-communist mafia states since 2013. He was an Open Society Fellow for carrying out comparative studies in this field (2015-2016), Hans Speier Visiting Professor at the New School (2017), and a Senior Fellow at the CEU Institute for Advanced Study (2018-2019). Formerly, he was an activist of the Hungarian anti-communist dissident movement, founder of the Liberal Party of Hungary (SZDSZ, 1988), a Member of the Hungarian Parliament (1990-2010), and the Hungarian Minister of Education (1996-1998, 2002-2006).

References
 Biography
 Biography

1952 births
Living people
Alliance of Free Democrats politicians
Education ministers of Hungary
Members of the National Assembly of Hungary (1990–1994)
Members of the National Assembly of Hungary (1994–1998)
Members of the National Assembly of Hungary (1998–2002)
Members of the National Assembly of Hungary (2002–2006)
Members of the National Assembly of Hungary (2006–2010)
Hungarian Jews
Politicians from Budapest